Copper Hill is an unincorporated community in Floyd County, Virginia, United States.  The settlement is located southwest of Roanoke.

Climate
The climate in this area is characterized by hot, humid summers and generally mild to cool winters.  According to the Köppen Climate Classification system, Copper Hill has a humid subtropical climate, abbreviated "Cfa" on climate maps.

References

Unincorporated communities in Floyd County, Virginia